Ramesh Surajmal Garg (born: 18 June 1948) or R. S. Garg is an Indian Judge and former Chief Justice of Gauhati High Court.

Career
Garg was born in 1948. He passed Masters degree in Economics and Law. He started practice in Madhya Pradesh High Court on Civil, Criminal, Revenue, Constitutional and Taxation matters. On 15 December 1994 Garg was appointed Additional Judge of the Madhya Pradesh High Court. He served as a judge of Patna High Court and Gujarat High Court also. He became the first acting Chief Justice of Chhattisgarh High Court in 2000. Justice Garg was appointed Acting Chief Justice of Madhya Pradesh High Court on 16 November 2009. On 17 April 2010, he was elevated to the post of Chief Justice of the Gauhati High Court.

References

1948 births
Living people
Indian judges
Judges of the Madhya Pradesh High Court
Judges of the Chhattisgarh High Court
Judges of the Patna High Court
Judges of the Gujarat High Court
Chief Justices of the Gauhati High Court
21st-century Indian judges